Asiapistosia is a genus of moths in the subfamily Arctiinae.

Most species were previously placed in the genus Eilema.

Species
 Asiapistosia subnigra (Leech, 1899)
 Asiapistosia stigma (C.L. Fang, 2000)

References

Lithosiina
Moth genera